Christianity in Somaliland is a small minority in numbers ranging from 100 to 200 Christians.<ref>"World Christian Encyclopedia  (2nd Edition), Volume 1, p. & Nbsp</ref> The Christians of Somaliland mainly consist of refugees from neighbouring countries, who continue to practise their religion secretly. The country's Christians are mostly foreigners. The Christian demographics include United Nations workers or other humanitarian agencies with bases in Hargeisa. As of 2021, however, there are at least some known local Christians in Somaliland. The church and its institutions such as Caritas International also work in relief and charitable work, and also run programs such as rehabilitation of schools and hospitals, food aid, and assistance to poor children.

History
In the ancient city of Mundus, located near Heis, archaeologists have found evidences of Christian worship in the fifth century.  Excavations here have yielded pottery and sherds of Roman glassware with Christian symbols from a time between the 1st and 5th centuries. Among these artefacts is high-quality millefiori glass; it features red flower disks superimposed on a green background.
However, prior to Islam, Christianity had no foothold in Somaliland until after the Colonial Era.

British Somaliland

In 1913, during the early period of the colonial era, there were practically no Christians in Somaliland, with about 100 to 200 adherents coming from schools and orphanages affiliated with the Catholic missions in the Protectorate of British Somaliland. The small number of Christians in the region today comes mostly from similar Catholic institutions in Aden, Djibouti and Berbera.

Somaliland is located within the bishopric area in the Horn of Africa and under the administration of the Anglican diocese in Egypt. However, there are no current Anglican communities in the region. However, since 1990 no bishop has been appointed from Mogadishu, and currently the bishop of Djibouti serves the diocese as an apostolic official. Adventist Mission indicates that there are no members in Somaliland.

Bibliography
 Tripodi, Paolo. The Colonial Legacy in Somalia''. St. Martin's Press. New York, 1999.

See also
Religion in Somaliland
Christianity in Somalia

Notes

 
Persecution of Christians by Muslims